Stinky Davis may refer to one of the following:

 Harry Davis (1930s first baseman) (1908–1997), American baseball player
 Kenneth W. Davis, American oil entrepreneur in Texas and father of T. Cullen Davis
 Stinky Davis, a character in the Toonerville Folks newspaper cartoon
 Oswald "Stinky" Davis, a character in The Abbott and Costello Show

See also
 Stinky (disambiguation)